Jackson Township is one of fourteen townships in Cass County, Indiana. As of the 2010 census, its population was 2,876.

History
Jackson Township was organized on June 6, 1847 in a meeting at the home of William Frush. It was named for Andrew Jackson, seventh President of the United States.

Geography

Cities and towns
 Galveston

Unincorporated towns
 Lincoln

Adjacent townships
 Tipton (north)
 Pipe Creek Township, Miami County (northeast)
 Deer Creek Township, Miami County (east)
 Clay Township, Howard County (south)
 Ervin Township, Howard County (southwest)
 Deer Creek (west)

Major highways
  U.S. Route 35
  Indiana State Road 18

Cemeteries
The township contains four cemeteries: McWilliams, Meeks, Patterson and Sprinkle.

References
 
 United States Census Bureau cartographic boundary files

External links

 Indiana Township Association
 United Township Association of Indiana

Townships in Cass County, Indiana
Townships in Indiana
1847 establishments in Indiana
Populated places established in 1847